The Best of Astounding: Classic Short Novels from the Golden Age of Science Fiction is an anthology of science fiction short works edited by James Gunn. It was first published in hardcover by Carroll & Graf in August 1992.

The book collects six novels, novellas and novelettes by various science fiction authors that were originally published in the 1930s-1950s in the science fiction magazine Astounding, together with an introduction by Poul Anderson.

Contents
"Introduction" (Poul Anderson)
"Sucker Bait" (Isaac Asimov)
"The Stolen Dormouse" (L. Sprague de Camp)
"The Fifth-Dimension Tube" (Murray Leinster)
"The Shadow Out of Time" (H. P. Lovecraft)
"Bindlestiff" (James Blish)
"We Have Fed Our Sea" (Poul Anderson)

Notes

1992 anthologies
Science fiction anthologies
Carroll & Graf books